Greg Burridge (born 12 September 1981) is an English professional wrestler, actor and stuntman, currently working with the London school of Lucha Libre, and co-owner of Lucha Britannia. Burridge started his career as a professional wrestler in 2002, best known for his time with 1 Pro Wrestling, Preston City Wrestling and Future Pro Wrestling.

Burridge started acting and performing stunts in 2008, working on films including Harry Potter and the Deathly Hallows – Part 2 and Dracula Untold. Burridge has also worked as a stunt director. In 2018, Burridge wrote and created his own feature-length movie, London Rampage.

References

English male professional wrestlers
1981 births
English male film actors
British stunt performers
Living people